Seafair is a summer festival in Seattle, Washington, that encompasses a wide variety of small neighborhood events leading up to several major citywide celebrations. While many small block parties and local parades occur under the auspices of Seafair, most Seattle residents associate Seafair with the Torchlight Parade (and accompanying Torchlight Run), Seafair Cup hydroplane races, and the Blue Angels. Seafair has been an annual event in Seattle since 1950 but its roots can be traced to the 1911 Seattle Golden Potlatch Celebrations.

History
The 2020 schedule for Seafair was cancelled on May 20, 2020, due to the COVID-19 pandemic and restrictions on public gatherings. In April 2021, the 2021 Seafair was also cancelled, stating that "while encouraged by Governor Inslee's Phase 3 guidelines that support small and medium size events to return with limitations, Seafair leadership recognizes the guidelines will not support events the scale of a city-wide festival."

Events
Seafair begins in mid-June; since 1949, its arrival has been heralded by the Seafair Pirates Landing on Alki Beach, and the Milk Carton Derby on Green Lake, a whimsical boat race in which all the boats have been constructed out of empty milk cartons. Entries always range from those carefully shaped for speed and stability to those designed for maximum amusement. The Derby is usually associated with a variety of activities for children and families on the shores of Green Lake.

The Seafair Half Marathon was added in 2002, follow three years later by the full Seafair Marathon. If a shorter distance is more appealing, participants can run or walk a 5 km course. The 2008 Seafair Half Marathon and Seafair Marathon began at Husky Stadium, crossed the Evergreen Point Floating Bridge, and ended at Bellevue, Washington's Bellevue Downtown Park. After the race, live music was performed. In 2009, the Seafair Marathon and Half Marathon were replaced with the Rock 'n' Roll Seattle Marathon and Half Marathon.

In 2013, an Independence Day fireworks show at Lake Union known as the Seafair Summer Fourth was added. The event serves as a de facto successor to the Family Fourth fireworks event formerly held at the same site, which had been discontinued by its organizers due to a lack of funding. The event was revived under the auspices of Seafair with the financial support of local sponsors.

The Seafair Triathlon is held on the shores of Lake Washington from Seward Park.  It features both Sprint - half-mile swim,  bike ride, and 5 km run - and Olympic distances. Participants can compete individually or as a team. Typically, the Seafair Triathlon is held the third weekend of July. In 2007, the Seafair Triathlon saw a record turnout of 2,200.

The Torchlight festivities

The last weekend in July belongs to the Torchlight Parade and Torchlight Run. Many local organizations participate in these events, held on the streets of downtown Seattle. The local woman who has been selected as "Miss Seafair" (prior to 1972, "Seafair Queen") plays a prominent role in the parade. It is traditionally preceded by the Torchlight Run, a short (8 km) race through the city's streets in which many participants run in costume.

The Seafair Weekend
One of the most popular events of the festival is the Seafair Weekend, held traditionally the first weekend of August on Genesee Park. Seafair Weekend main events include hydroplane racing on the water and aerobatics show in the sky.

The Seafair Cup is an American Boat Racing Association unlimited hydroplane racing circuit stop at  Stan Sayres Memorial Park on Lake Washington, in the Seward Park neighborhood. The races attract tens of thousands of spectators, both those standing on the public shores of the lake, and those in boats anchored just outside the course in the lake itself.

A tradition started in 1972, the Seafair Air Show is an aerobatics show coincidently with the days of the Seafair Cup. World-class aerobatics teams perform their aerial stunts over Lake Washington, most prominently the US Navy Blue Angels and US Army Golden Knights. Notoriously, the Blue Angels have been attending the Air Show annually since its first edition, excepting in three occasions. The aerobatics show is a slightly controversial part of Seafair, as some local residents fear an accident involving the low-flying aircraft, and some find the noise of the jet engines irritating. There was no show at Seafair in 1994 and 1995 as a result of a dispute with the FAA about whether they could safely fly over Lake Washington. In 1996 the Blue Angels flew over Elliott Bay, west of downtown Seattle, in a separate event from the hydroplane race, but this was a financial flop, and they returned to being part of the race-weekend festivities over Lake Washington in 1997.
Due to government budget cuts, the Blue Angels did not perform at Seafair 2013; they were replaced by the Patriots Jet Team.
From 2019, the aerobatics show fly-over area was moved south to avoid the closing of the floating bridges carrying Interstate 90 between Mercer Island and Seattle during the three days of Seafair Weekend.

Groups

The Seafair Pirates

Another aspect of Seafair is the involvement of the Seafair Pirates, an organization that works year-round entertaining children in hospitals and performing other acts of community service including extensive fundraising. However, the pirates also usually perform loud—occasionally offensive—antics at Seafair (in an attempt to live up to their name) that cause perennial objection to their prominent involvement in the festivities. Despite this reputation, most people who enjoy Seafair see them as an essential part of the event.

References

Air shows in the United States
Washington (state) culture
Festivals in Seattle
Seattle Center
H1 Unlimited

Boat festivals
1950 establishments in Washington (state)
Recurring events established in 1950
Aviation in Washington (state)